Felix McGrogan (27 July 1914 - 13 December 1989) was a Scottish footballer who played for Blackburn Rovers, Dunfermline Athletic, Falkirk, Kilmarnock and Dumbarton.

References

1914 births
1989 deaths
Scottish footballers
Kilmarnock F.C. players
Dunfermline Athletic F.C. players
Falkirk F.C. players
Blackburn Rovers F.C. players
Dumbarton F.C. wartime guest players
English Football League players
Association football wingers